Kingdom of Silver & Keepsake is a Big Finish Productions audio drama based on the long-running British science fiction television series Doctor Who. It contains a three-part story and a one-part story as well.

Kingdom of Silver

Plot
The planet Tasak is about to enter its industrial age.  But it arrives as the result of a terrible secret from its past.

Cast
The Doctor — Sylvester McCoy
Magus Riga — Terry Molloy
Temeter — Neil Roberts
Sara — Kate Terence
Merel — James George
Ardith — Bunny Reed
Etin — Holly King
The Cybermen — Nicholas Briggs

Keepsake

Plot
At a junkyard in the far future, the Doctor discovers the fate of some old friends.

Cast
The Doctor — Sylvester McCoy
Temeter — Neil Roberts
Sara — Kate Terence
Examiner 2 — Terry Molloy
Corvus — James George
Examiner 1 — Nicholas Briggs

Notes
Terry Molloy played Davros, the creator of the Daleks, in Resurrection of the Daleks, Revelation of the Daleks and Remembrance of the Daleks, as well as in several previous audio dramas. This is the second time that he has appeared in Doctor Who media playing a character other than Davros, having portrayed an undercover police officer named Russell in Attack of the Cybermen.

External links
Big Finish Productions – Kingdom of Silver

2008 audio plays
Seventh Doctor audio plays
Cybermen audio plays